Siah Dowlan (also Romanized as Sīāh Dowlān) is a village in Alan Baraghush Rural District, Mehraban District, Sarab County, East Azerbaijan Province, Iran. At the 2006 census, its population was 179, in 33 families.

References 

Populated places in Sarab County